Murski Vrh is a settlement in the hills south of Hrastje in the Municipality of Radenci in northeastern Slovenia.

References

External links
Murski Vrh on Geopedia

Populated places in the Municipality of Radenci